Saja may refer to:

People 
 Kazimieras Saja (born 1932), Lithuanian writer and politician
 Pietro Saja (1779–1833), Italian painter
 Saiful Alam Saja, Bangladeshi politician
 Sebastián Saja (born 1979), Argentine football goalkeeper

Places 
 Saja Assembly constituency, Chhattisgarh, India
 Saja (river), Spain
 Saja, Tanzania

Other uses 
 Saja Records
 South Asian Journalists Association